Mitra is a given name. 

People with the name include:

 Mitra Bir (died 1978), freedom fighter and educationist from Goa, India
 Mitra Farahani (born 1975), Iranian filmmaker and painter
 Mitra Farazandeh (born. c. 1976), Iranian disability activist, artist
 Mitra Hajjar (born 1977), Iranian actress
 Mitra Jouhari (born 1993), American actress, and writer
 Mitra Phukan, Indian author
 Mitra Tabrizian, British-Iranian photographer and film director

See also 
 Mitra (surname)

Persian feminine given names
Indian feminine given names